Odontothrips is a genus of insects belonging to the family Thripidae.

The species of this genus are found in Europe and Southeastern Asia.

Species:
 Odontothrips aemulans Priesner, 1924 
 Odontothrips ausralis Bagnall

References

Thripidae
Thrips genera